The 1986 Transamerica Open, also known as the Pacific Coast Championships, was a men's tennis tournament played on indoor carpet courts at the Cow Palace in San Francisco, California in the United States. The event was part of the 1986 Nabisco Grand Prix circuit. It was the 98th edition of the tournament and was held from September 22 through September 28, 1986. Fourth-seeded John McEnroe won the singles title, his fifth and last at the event after 1978, 1979, 1982, and 1984 and earned $44,000 first-prize money.

Finals

Singles

 John McEnroe defeated  Jimmy Connors 7–6(8–6), 6–3
 It was McEnroe's 2nd singles title of the year and the 69th of his career.

Doubles

 Peter Fleming /  John McEnroe defeated  Mike De Palmer /  Gary Donnelly 6–4, 7–6(7–2)

See also
 Connors–McEnroe rivalry

References

External links
 ITF tournament edition details

Transamerica Open
Pacific Coast International Open
Transamerica Open
Transamerica Open
Transamerica Open